The siege of Iwatsurugi Castle was fought in 1554 near Kagoshima Bay at the southern end of the island of Kyushu, Japan. The siege was just one of a number of military actions that Shimazu Takahisa had to take against his rebellious kokujin vassals in the Ito and Kimotsuki clans.

Iwatsurugi Castle was a castle near the coast of Kagoshima Bay, in the vicinity of modern-day Shigetomi Beach, in what is now Aira, Kagoshima. During the siege, Ijuin Tadaaki, one of the Shimazu generals, maneuvered five ships to within range and proceeded with an offshore bombardment of the enemy garrison, a few of whom were killed. The siege lasted a few weeks until the castle fell.

References 

Iwatsurugi
1554 in Japan
Shimazu clan
Sieges involving Japan
Conflicts in 1554